Domenico Luca Morelli (born 31 December 1987) is an Italian motorcycle racer who has competed in the 250cc World Championship, the Superbike World Championship and the Superstock 1000 FIM Cup.

Career statistics

Grand Prix motorcycle racing

By season

Races by year
(key)

Superbike World Championship

Races by year
(key)

References

External links
 Profile on MotoGP.com
 Profile on WorldSBK.com

1987 births
Living people
People from Ariano Irpino
Italian motorcycle racers
250cc World Championship riders
FIM Superstock 1000 Cup riders
Superbike World Championship riders
Sportspeople from the Province of Avellino